The Compound, also known as Street Patterns or The Grid, is an area in southwestern Palm Bay, Florida, similar to Flagler Estates. General Development Corporation began development of the area in the late 1980s, but went bankrupt in 1991; afterward, few residents ever moved in, and the streets fell into serious disrepair by the early 2000s. However, recently new development of the area has begun to form into a housing development.

Affected streets
Bombardier Boulevard: Now home to a facility for Bombardier Recreational Products, after which the road was renamed.
Gamrott Street
Olsen Street
Gatsin Street
Hammonton Street
Hanford Road
Gamewell Road
Gaspar Street
Heritage Street
Emerson Drive: Paved, and renamed Osmosis Drive as of late 2009.
Olean Street
Olsmar Street: Paved as of late 2009.
Galicia Street
Lachine Street
Ocarina Street
Friendly Street
Fitchburg Street: Paved as of late 2009.
Garder Road
Olin Road
Felton Street
Fredrick Street
Frazer Street
Labra Road
Haines Road
Franzing Road
La Fleur Street
Faulkner Street
St. Andre Boulevard: Paved as of 2016 for use in the recent St. Johns Heritage Parkway extension.

Most roads in the area have not since been repaved.

Geography
To the west is the St. Johns River and Three Forks Marsh. To the southeast is Deer Run. To the east is Bayside Lakes, and to the north is Palm Bay Regional Park.

Paintball
A section of Palm Bay is also home to the first city-run paintball park known as Hurricane Paintball Park. Discharge of a paintball gun is illegal within the city of Palm Bay, except at a municipal paintball field. In response to complaints of illegal paintball games within the compound, the Palm Bay City Council ordered the Palm Bay Department of Parks and Recreation to develop a city paintball park as a safe, legal and affordable place to play paintball within the city.

Initially constructed with city funds, materials donated by local businesses and volunteer labor provided by local paintball players, the park has suffered several closures due to management issues, allegations of wrongdoing by contractors and budget issues. One of which was "Invincibles Paintball," a commercial paintball field operator that runs additional locations in Port St. Lucie and Fort Pierce.

In December 2009, Fillion Paintball was in charge of park operations.

"Hurrican Paintball Park" Recently went under.

Currently the field is known as "Palm Bay Paintball Park" and is owned by "Nightmare Inc."

Off-Road sports 
The compound is also used by off-road sports enthusiasts. There are sections of the area that have dirt trails that have been formed from repeated use. The sand tends to be sugar sand and very soft in spots, making it challenging at times. Riding dirt bikes and ATVs off road here is illegal and would be considered trespassing. The police are cracking down on off-road use after several events resulting in the death of riders, as of January 2021. The northern edge of the property is particularly appealing to dirt bikers and ATV riders because there are some large man-made hills there, but this is private property owned by Bombardier Industries. According the Palm Bay Police it is "Unlawful to be out at the compound trespassing on other peoples property" (November 30 at 3:06 PM)

Paramotoring 
Initially used as a means of surveillance by law enforcement, the Palm Bay Police Department began paramotoring in the vicinity of the compound. Para sport enthusiasts since, have used The Compound, due to its large open spaces, contiguous uninhabited areas and skyline free from obstructions for both recreational purposes and training. As a safe minimal risk operating location for paramotoring, the paramotoring community has contributed much to the preservation of The Compound, by working with law-enforcement, reporting law and traffic violations while providing a general custodianship of the properties. The paramotoring community further enhances public relations, by organizing property maintenance such as mowing, occasional roadway maintenance and trash removal. The air space immediately overhead The Compound and some of the adjacent agricultural and swamp areas, is arguably the least congested airspace in the entire state of Florida.  It is therefore an ideal safe haven for the activity, which brings a significant financial revenue to the greater municipal areas of Palm Bay.

Spaceport Rocketry Association 
With permission from the city of Palm Bay and the FAA, Spaceport Rocketry Association  (SRA) conducts monthly low, mid, and high power rocket launches in the compound. SRA is affiliated with both the National Association of Rocketry (NAR) and the Tripoli Rocketry Association (TRA).

Remote control airplane operations 
RC airplane enthusiasts frequently use the stretch of Sapodilla Rd SW by Wishbone Ave SW.

Tough Mudder 
The Compound has played host to two annual Tough Mudder events in 2015, and 2016 respectively. Both events generated large amounts of revenue for both Palm Bay and surrounding areas that hosted competitors. As of 2017, it unknown whether the site will host future Tough Mudder events.

Future use 
The St. Johns Heritage Parkway will pass through this portion of Palm Bay as a part of the future connection to the currently under construction Interstate 95 interchange just north of Micco Rd., construction of this section of the parkway is tentatively set to begin in the early 2020s.

References

External links
Hog Wild Paintball Field
Palm Bay Paintball Park
Tough Mudder

Palm Bay, Florida
Geography of Brevard County, Florida